Simon Kverndal QC (died 14 June 2020) was a British barrister specialising in maritime law.

References

1950s births
2020 deaths
English King's Counsel